Kiefer William Sutherland (born 21 December 1966) is a British-Canadian actor and musician. He is best known for his starring role as Jack Bauer in the Fox drama series 24 (2001–2010, 2014), for which he won an Emmy Award, a Golden Globe Award, two Screen Actors Guild Awards, and two Satellite Awards.

Sutherland got his first leading film role in the Canadian drama The Bay Boy (1984), which earned him a Genie Award nomination. Since that time he has had a successful film career, starring in films such as Stand by Me (1986), The Lost Boys (1987), Young Guns (1988), Flatliners (1990), A Few Good Men (1992), The Three Musketeers (1993), A Time to Kill (1996), Dark City (1998), Phone Booth (2002), Melancholia (2011), Pompeii (2014) and Flatliners (2017).

He has also starred as Martin Bohm in the Fox drama Touch, and provided the facial motion capture and English voice for Venom Snake in the video games Metal Gear Solid V: Ground Zeroes and Metal Gear Solid V: The Phantom Pain. He starred as President Tom Kirkman in the ABC/Netflix political drama series Designated Survivor.

Sutherland has been inducted to the Hollywood Walk of Fame and to Canada's Walk of Fame, and has received a Lifetime Achievement Award at the Zurich Film Festival.

Early life 
Sutherland was born on 21 December 1966 at St Mary's Hospital in the Paddington district of London, to Donald Sutherland and Shirley Douglas, both successful Canadian actors who had been living and working in England. He has a twin sister, Rachel Sutherland, who works as a post-production film supervisor. His maternal grandfather was Scottish-born Canadian politician and former Premier of Saskatchewan Tommy Douglas, who is widely credited for bringing universal health care to Canada.

Sutherland is named after American-born writer and director Warren Kiefer, who directed Donald Sutherland in his first feature film, Castle of the Living Dead.
Sutherland's family moved to Corona, California, in 1968. His parents divorced in 1970. In 1975, Sutherland moved with his mother to Toronto, Ontario. He attended Crescent Town Elementary School, St. Clair Junior High (now Gordon A. Brown Middle School) East York, and John G. Althouse Middle School in Toronto. He attended several high schools, including St. Andrew's College, Martingrove Collegiate Institute, Harbord Collegiate Institute, Silverthorn Collegiate Institute, Malvern Collegiate Institute, and Annex Village Campus. He also spent a semester at Regina Mundi Catholic College in London, Ontario and attended weekend acting lessons at Sir Frederick Banting Secondary School. Sutherland told Jimmy Kimmel Live! (2009) that he and Robert Downey Jr. were roommates for three years when he first moved to Hollywood to pursue his career in acting. He and Downey also starred together in the film 1969 (1988).

Career

1980s: Rise to fame in Hollywood 
Sutherland made his screen debut in Max Dugan Returns (as did Matthew Broderick), in which his father Donald Sutherland also starred. Sutherland was one of the contenders for the role of Glen Lantz in the original A Nightmare on Elm Street (1984), which ultimately became Johnny Depp's feature film debut.

After receiving critical acclaim for his role as Donald Campbell in The Bay Boy, Sutherland moved to Hollywood. Stand by Me was the first film Sutherland made in the United States. In the film, directed by Rob Reiner, he played a neighbourhood bully in a coming-of-age story about a search for a dead body. Before that, he played a silent, supporting character, as one of Sean Penn's friends who goes up against Christopher Walken in James Foley's crime-thriller At Close Range.

He next appeared as vampire David in Joel Schumacher's The Lost Boys in 1987. Promised Land (1988), with Meg Ryan, was the first film to be commissioned by the Sundance Film Festival.

In the Western film Young Guns (1988), he starred alongside Emilio Estevez and Lou Diamond Phillips. He was considered for the role of Robin in Batman (1989), alongside Michael Keaton, in the early production before the character was deleted from the shooting script. He went on to star again with his close friend Lou Diamond Phillips, in the crime-action film Renegades. That same year, he and his father appeared at the 61st Academy Awards as presenters of the Academy Honorary Award to the National Film Board of Canada.

1990s: Success in films 

In the sequel Young Guns II (1990), Sutherland continued to play 'Doc' alongside some of the original cast and with newcomer Christian Slater. , it is the only sequel to a feature film he has starred in. Sutherland starred as the lead in Flatliners, with an ensemble cast featuring Julia Roberts and Kevin Bacon, a film about a student who wants to "experience" death's afterlife and record what happens during it, with the help of a group of young students who are "a little" crazy like him; the film received positive reviews from critics. He plays a young FBI agent coming to terms with his life in a commune in Flashback (1990) alongside Dennis Hopper. Sutherland had also starred in The Nutcracker Prince as Hans/The Nutcracker.

Sutherland did not make a film in 1991. During an interview in March 2012, he said he had declined director Gus Van Sant's offer to star in the lead role in the movie My Own Private Idaho, a decision that he regretted. He was quoted as saying "I passed on My Private Idaho because I wanted to go skiing and didn't even look at it. I told myself that I needed to stick to my plan ... and it was a really dumb plan."

In 1992, he played a doctor alongside Ray Liotta in the drama Article 99.  He played a supporting character in Twin Peaks: Fire Walk with Me, the continuation of the short-lived television series of the same name which ran from 1990 to 1991, as agent Sam Stanley; and also in A Few Good Men (1992), where he played a junior officer subordinate to Jack Nicholson's Col. Nathan R. Jessup. The film was nominated for the Academy Award for Best Picture.

In The Vanishing (1993), he starred alongside Jeff Bridges as a desperate man seeking the whereabouts of his girlfriend, three years after she mysteriously vanished. In The Three Musketeers (1993), Sutherland played the central character of Athos.

In 1996, Sutherland appeared in three films. He starred with Reese Witherspoon in Freeway, which gained a cult following. He starred with Sally Field in the thriller Eye for an Eye, and he appeared in A Time to Kill alongside his father Donald Sutherland.

In 1998, he starred in Dark City, the science fiction film directed by Alex Proyas in which he portrayed the historical character Daniel P. Schreber. Sutherland also starred in the film Ground Control where he played Jack Harries, an air traffic controller who had a perfect record until one air crash haunts him to leave the business. Years later, he is hurtled back into the world he thought he left behind.

2000s: 24 

In 2000, he co-starred with Woody Allen in the black comedy Picking Up the Pieces, but the film was received poorly by both commercial audiences and by critics. Since then, Sutherland has starred in small projects and festival-released films. He starred in the film Beat, which premiered at the Sundance Film Festival in 2000. He also appeared in 2001 film Cowboy Up, which won the Crystal Heart Award at the 2001 Heartland Film Festival. He also starred in the film To End All Wars, which won two awards at the Heartland Film Festival and one award at the Hawaii International Film Festival.

Since 2001, Sutherland has been associated most widely with the role of Jack Bauer on the critically acclaimed television series 24. After being nominated four times for the "Outstanding Lead Actor in a Drama Series" Primetime Emmy Award, Sutherland won the award in 2006 for his role in 24'''s fifth season. In the opening skit of the 2006 Primetime Emmy Awards, Sutherland made an appearance as his 24 character, Jack Bauer. He was also nominated for Best actor in a Drama Television Series at the 2007 Golden Globe Awards for 24. According to his 2006 contract, his salary of $40 million for three seasons of the show made him the highest-earning actor on television.

Sutherland constantly emphasizes that the show is merely "entertainment." The dean of the United States Military Academy, Brigadier General Patrick Finnegan, visited the set of 24 in February 2007 to urge the show's makers to reduce the number of torture scenes and Sutherland accepted an invitation from the U.S. military to tell West Point cadets that it is wrong to torture prisoners. In an interview with OK! Magazine, Howard Gordon said it would be an "unbearable loss" if they killed off Sutherland's character.

Due to his extensive schedule with 24, he spent less time in film. In 2004, he starred in Taking Lives, alongside Angelina Jolie and Ethan Hawke, in which he had a "flashy cameo". In The Sentinel (2006), he starred alongside Michael Douglas, as his protégé and he also starred in Disney's The Wild where he voiced the character Samson. He played the lead roles in Alexandre Aja's supernatural horror, Mirrors (2008). In 2009, he joined the DreamWorks's animated film Monsters vs. Aliens, reuniting him with actress Reese Witherspoon with whom he starred in Freeway. Monsters vs. Aliens is Sutherland's highest-grossing film to date.

The actor is also a frequent collaborator with director Joel Schumacher, and has appeared in The Lost Boys, Flatliners, Phone Booth, the big screen adaptation of A Time to Kill (the film also starred his father Donald, although their characters did not interact), and Twelve as the narrator.

In 2005, Sutherland was inducted into Canada's Walk of Fame in Toronto, where both of his parents have also been inducted. He ranked No. 68 on the 2006 Forbes Celebrity 100 list of the world's most powerful celebrities, his earnings were a reported $23 million. In 2009, he was awarded a star on the Hollywood Walk of Fame. Sutherland was the first Inside the Actors Studio guest to be the child of a former guest; his father, Donald, appeared on the show in 1998. Sutherland was featured on the cover of the April 2006 edition of Rolling Stone, in an article entitled "Alone in the Dark with Kiefer Sutherland." The article began with Sutherland revealing his interest to be killed off in 24. However, he stated, "Don't get me wrong. I love what I do." It also revealed that he devoted 10 months a year working on 24.

He has starred in Japanese commercials for CalorieMate, performing a parody of his Jack Bauer character. Sutherland also provides voice-overs for the current ad campaign for the Ford Motor Company of Canada. In mid-2006, he voiced the Apple, Inc. advertisement announcing the inclusion of Intel chips in their Macintosh computer line. He also voices the introduction to NHL games on the Versus network in the U.S.

 2010s: Post-24 film, television, and music projects 
On 14 February 2010, Fox TV announced they were temporarily suspending production of Season 8 of 24 due to a ruptured cyst near one of Sutherland's kidneys. According to the report, he waited a few days before going in to have "elective surgery" performed. It was anticipated that he would return after a week, but a few days further were needed and Fox reported that his return to set would be 1 March.

In the 2011 drama-thriller Melancholia directed by Lars Von Trier, he played the male lead character and got the chance to share the screen with long-lost co-stars such as Charlotte Rampling and John Hurt, the film in which Kiefer was nominated for the major Danish film prize Bodil. Kiefer also shared the screen with Hurt another time, this time on the small screen, in the web series The Confession.

In The Reluctant Fundamentalist (2013), the best-selling novel adaptation directed by Mira Nair, he played a supporting character for newcomer Riz Ahmed, as a boss named Jim Cross, and in the 2014 historical-disaster movie, Pompeii, directed by Paul W. S. Anderson, he played a corrupt Roman senator who plotted to stop the love between the city ruler's daughter and a Roman slave whose family was killed by the senator.

Sutherland also provided narration for several promotional spots for the United States Men's National Soccer Team during the 2014 FIFA World Cup for ESPN. He has appeared in a Brazilian TV commercials for Citroën C4 sedan and a voice-over for a commercial for Bank of America. He voices Sgt. Roebuck in Treyarch's video game Call of Duty: World at War and voices Big Boss in the video game Metal Gear Solid V: Ground Zeroes and its sequel Metal Gear Solid V: The Phantom Pain, taking over the role originally performed by David Hayter.

In 2011, Sutherland made his Broadway debut, opposite Brian Cox, Jim Gaffigan, Chris Noth and Jason Patric, in the Broadway revival of That Championship Season, which opened in March 2011. The show has since closed.

In 2012, Sutherland starred in the Fox television series Touch. He played the father of an autistic boy who does not like to be touched, while the son also communicates future humanity interrelated events to his father through numbers and mathematics.

On 14 May 2013, it was confirmed that the show 24 would return for a limited series. Before that, he was also offered the lead role in the NBC drama The Blacklist. In May and July 2014, Fox aired the twelve-episode 24: Live Another Day, which received acclaimed reviews from critics. Although he did not appear in 2017's 24: Legacy, he was the show's executive producer.

After working in the movie industry for more than 30 years, he had the chance to star with his father, Donald Sutherland, in the western-drama film Forsaken, which also stars Demi Moore and Brian Cox. The film screened at the Toronto International Film Festival and received mixed reviews from critics.

In 2015, it was announced that Sutherland was cast in the lead role of the former ABC political drama series Designated Survivor as Tom Kirkman, the President of the United States. The show was renewed by Netflix for a third season which was released on 7 June 2019.

In 2016, Sutherland released his first album, Down in a Hole, and a music video for "Not Enough Whiskey" from the album. The country music songs were written by Sutherland and Jude Cole. The Kiefer Sutherland Band toured in April and May of that year, and debuted at the Grand Ole Opry on June 6, 2016. A 2017 review in The Guardian said, "you have the first Hollywood hobby act unshackled by convention and with a real shot at greatness." The band performed in Scotland and in Las Vegas in 2019. The band's second album, Reckless and Me, was released in April 2019.

2020s
Sutherland plays Det. Clay Bryce in the American action thriller television series The Fugitive, which premiered on August 3, 2020.

 Personal life 

 Family and relationships 

Sutherland has one daughter (Sarah) from his marriage to Camelia Kath, the widow of Chicago guitarist/singer Terry Kath, to whom he was married from 1987 to 1990. Through their marriage, he became stepfather to Camelia's daughter, Michelle Kath, who has two sons. Sarah Sutherland is an actress and appeared on the TV series Veep.

Julia Roberts met Sutherland in 1990, when they co-starred in Flatliners. In August 1990, Roberts and Sutherland announced their engagement, with an elaborate studio-planned wedding scheduled for 14 June 1991. Roberts broke the engagement three days before the wedding allegedly because Sutherland had been meeting with a go-go dancer named Amanda Rice. Sutherland denied having an affair with Rice and said that they only met because he liked to play pool. On the day of what was supposed to be their wedding, Roberts went to Ireland with Sutherland's friend Jason Patric.

In the late 1990s, Sutherland purchased a  ranch in Montana and toured on the rodeo circuit.

On 29 June 1996, Sutherland married Kelly Winn. The couple separated in 1999, and he filed for divorce in 2004. The divorce was finalized on 16 May 2008. He dated Bo Derek in 2000.

Sutherland began dating model/actress Cindy Vela of Olmito, Texas sometime in 2014, keeping their relationship private up until 2017 when they began to be seen together in public. Vela and Sutherland became engaged in 2017.'' , they reside in Toluca Lake, Los Angeles.

Legal issues 

Sutherland was charged in Los Angeles on 25 September 2007, on drunk driving charges, after failing a field sobriety test. His test exceeded the state's legal blood alcohol limit, and he was later released on a $25,000 bail. It was Sutherland's fourth DUI charge since 1989. Sutherland pleaded no contest to the DUI charge and was sentenced to 48 days in jail.

Sutherland surrendered to the NYPD on 6 May 2009 for head-butting fashion designer Jack McCollough, founder and co-designer of Proenza Schouler, at The Mercer Hotel in SoHo following a fundraiser for the Metropolitan Museum of Art. Several weeks later, Sutherland and McCollough issued a joint statement in which Sutherland apologized; police later dropped the charges.

Business ventures 

Sutherland is the co-owner (along with Jude Cole) of the independent record label Ironworks.

Sutherland reportedly fell victim to a financial scam involving cattle in 2010. According to the Associated Press, the perpetrator, Michael Wayne Carr, took US$869,000 from Sutherland, ostensibly in order to buy steers which were never purchased. Carr pleaded guilty and was ordered to pay US$956,000 in restitution to Sutherland and his investment partner.

Political views

In his January 2007 interview with Charlie Rose, Sutherland said of his political views: 
I believe inherently that we have a responsibility to take care of each other, so when you talk about socialized health care: absolutely, that's a no-brainer. Free universities: absolutely, that's a no-brainer. So, in the definition, I guess those are leaning toward socialist politics. To me, it's common sense.

Charity work

Sutherland is a member of a Canadian charity Artists Against Racism.

Awards and recognition 
 2003: Sweden TNT award for Best Foreign TV Personality – Male
 2005: Canada's Walk of Fame
 2008: Hollywood Walk of Fame
 2013: Hasty Pudding Theatricals for Man of the Year
 2015: Zurich Film Festival for Lifetime Achievement Award

Filmography

Discography

Albums

Music videos

See also

References

External links 

 
 
 Kiefer Sutherland at BAFTA Attendees Confirmed For This Sunday’s EE British Academy Film Awards
 Kiefer Sutherland producer profile on The 1 Second Film
 

1966 births
20th-century Canadian male actors
21st-century Canadian male actors
Best Drama Actor Golden Globe (television) winners
Canadian expatriate male actors in the United States
Canadian country singers
Canadian male film actors
Canadian male television actors
Canadian male video game actors
Canadian male voice actors
Canadian people of Scottish descent
English people of Canadian descent
English people of Scottish descent
St. Andrew's College (Aurora) alumni
Living people
Male actors from Toronto
Male actors from London
Musicians from Toronto
Outstanding Performance by a Lead Actor in a Drama Series Primetime Emmy Award winners
Outstanding Performance by a Male Actor in a Drama Series Screen Actors Guild Award winners
Kiefer
Canadian twins